MSG3 may refer to:
 
A variant of the Heckler & Koch G3 German battle rifle
An overflow feed of the MSG Network that existed in the 1990s